Border Run (earlier title The Mule) is a 2012 American mystery thriller film produced by Lucas Jarach and directed by Gabriela Tagliavini. The film is based on true events and was released on DVD in February 2013. Sharon Stone stars as an American reporter who searches for her missing brother. The film depicts human smuggling across the United States/Mexican border.

Plot
Stone portrays journalist Sofie Talbert, a hard-hitting journalist against illegal immigration to the United States. Learning that her brother in Mexico has gone missing, she goes to find him and uncovers the brutal reality of the desperate people who risk their lives to cross into the States. The film also points out that some illegals are twice-removed from their country of origin, having crossed from Central America into Mexico and then the United States, which increases the hazards they face.

Recognition
Border Run earned a nomination for Best Feature Film at the 2013 Imagen Foundation Awards.

Cast

External links
 
 

2012 films
2012 crime thriller films
2012 independent films
2010s mystery thriller films
2012 thriller drama films
American crime thriller films
American independent films
American mystery thriller films
American thriller drama films
Films about drugs
Films about rape
Films about human trafficking
Films about illegal immigration to the United States
Films about journalists
Films about missing people
Films about siblings
Films set in Mexico
Human trafficking in Mexico
Voltage Pictures films
Scanbox Entertainment films
2012 drama films
2010s English-language films
2010s American films